is a Japanese adult visual novel developed by Unisonshift and was released on December 23, 2004, for Windows. The gameplay in Peace@Pieces follows a linear plot line, which offers pre-determined scenarios and courses of interaction, and focuses on the appeal of the main female characters.

Development
Peace@Pieces was the tenth project developed by Unisonshift, and is developed as an adult game much like previous titles such as Innocent Eye's. Planning for the game was headed by @Pieces. Art direction and character designs were provided by Noizi Ito, known for her work on Shakugan no Shana, the Haruhi Suzumiya franchise, and the later Nanatsuiro Drops. The scenario was provided solely by Tamaki Ichikawa. Music in the game was solely composed by Ryō Mizutsuki, known for her later contributions on BaseSon's Koihime Musō, and Key Sounds Label's Piano no Mori.

Release history
Peace@Pieces was first introduced to the public on December 23, 2004, as a DVD-ROM playable on only a Microsoft Windows PC, and was subsequently followed by a fan disc, titled One More@Pieces, released on August 9, 2005. It was later followed by a second release, titled Peace@Pieces + One More@Pieces Special Memorial Edition, released on November 22, 2007, containing the game itself and the fan disc.

References

External links
Official Peace@Pieces visual novel website 

2004 video games
Bishōjo games
Eroge
Japan-exclusive video games
Romance video games
Seinen manga
Video games developed in Japan
Visual novels
Windows games
Windows-only games